Both the British Imperial and United States customary systems of measurement derive from earlier English systems used in the Middle Ages, that were the result of a combination of the local Anglo-Saxon units inherited from Germanic tribes and Roman units brought by William the Conqueror after the Norman Conquest of England in 1066.

Having this shared heritage, the two systems are quite similar, but there are differences. The US customary system is based on English systems of the 18th century, while the Imperial system was defined in 1824, almost a half-century after American independence.

Volume

Volume may be measured either in terms of units of cubic length or with specific volume units. The units of cubic length (the cubic inch, cubic foot, cubic mile, etc.) are the same in the imperial and US customary systems but with the specific units of volume (the bushel, gallon, fluid ounce, etc.) they differ. The US customary system has one set of units for fluids and another set for dry goods. The imperial system has only one set defined independently of and subdivided differently from its US counterparts.

By the end of the eighteenth century various systems of volume measurement were in use throughout the British Empire. Wine was measured with units based on the wine gallon of 231 cubic inches (3.785 L). Beer was measured with units based on an ale gallon of 282 cubic inches (4.621 L). Grain was measured with the Winchester measure with a gallon of approximately 268.8 cubic inches (one eighth of a Winchester bushel or 4.405 L). In 1824 these were replaced with a single system based on the imperial gallon.

The Winchester measure was made obsolete in the British Empire but remained in use in the US. The Winchester bushel was replaced with an imperial bushel of 8 imperial gallons.  The subdivisions of the bushel were maintained. As with US dry measures the imperial system divides the bushel into 4 pecks, 8 gallons, 32 quarts or 64 pints. Thus all of these imperial measures are about 3% larger than their US dry measure counterparts.

Fluid measure is not as straightforward. The American colonists adopted a system based on the 231-cubic-inch wine gallon for all fluid purposes. This became the US fluid gallon. Both the imperial and US fluid gallon are divided into 4 quarts, 8 pints or 32 gills. However, whereas the US gill is divided into 4 US fluid ounces, the imperial gill is divided into 5 imperial fluid ounces. So whilst the imperial gallon, quart, pint and gill are about 20% larger than their US fluid measure counterparts, the fluid ounce is about 4% smaller. Note that one avoirdupois ounce of water has an approximate volume of one imperial fluid ounce at 62 °F (16.67 °C). This convenient fluid-ounce-to-avoirdupois-ounce relation does not exist in the US system.

One noticeable comparison between the imperial system and the US system is between some Canadian and American beer bottles. Many Canadian brewers package beer in a 12-imperial-fluid-ounce bottles, which are 341 mL each. American brewers package their beer in 12-US-fluid-ounce bottles, which are 355 mL each. This results in the Canadian bottles being labelled as 11.5 fl oz in US units when imported into the United States. Because Canadian beer bottles predate the adoption of the Metric System in that country, they are still sold and labelled in Canada as 341 mL. Canned beer in Canada is sold and labelled in 355 mL cans, and when exported to the US are labelled as 12 fl oz.

Length
The international yard is defined as exactly 0.9144 metres. This definition was agreed on by the United States, Canada, the United Kingdom, South Africa, Australia and New Zealand through the international yard and pound agreement of 1959, and corresponds with the previous 1930s British and American definitions of 1 inch being 25.4 mm.  In all systems, a yard is 36 inches.

The US survey foot and survey mile were maintained as separate units for surveying purposes to avoid the accumulation of error that would follow replacing them with the international versions, particularly with State Plane Coordinate Systems. The choice of unit for surveying purposes is based on the unit used when the overall framework or geodetic datum for the region was established, so that - for example - much of the former British empire still uses the Clarke foot for surveying.

The US survey foot is defined so that 1 metre is exactly 39.37 inches, making the international foot of 0.3048 metres exactly two parts per million shorter. This is a difference of just over 3.2 mm, or a little over one eighth of an inch per mile. According to the National Institute of Standards and Technology, the survey foot will be obsolete as of 1 January 2023, and its use discouraged.

The main units of length (inch, foot, yard and international mile) were the same in the US, though the US rarely uses some of the intermediate units today, such as the (surveyor's) chain (22 yards) and the furlong (220 yards).

At one time, the definition of the nautical mile was based on the sphere whose surface is the same as the Clarke Ellipsoid. While the US used the full value of 1853.256 metres, in the Commonwealth, this was rounded to 6080 feet (1853.184 m). These have been replaced by the international version (which rounds the sixtieth part of the 45° to the nearest metre) of 1852 metres.

Weight and mass

Traditionally, both Britain and the US used three different weight systems: troy weight for precious metals, apothecaries' weight for medicines, and avoirdupois weight for almost all other purposes. However, apothecaries' weight has now been superseded by the metric system.

One important difference is the widespread use in Britain of the stone of 14 pounds for body weight; this unit is not used in the United States, although its influence was seen in the practice of selling flour by a barrel of 196 pounds (14 stone) until World War II.

Another difference arose when Britain abolished the troy pound on 1 January 1879, leaving only the troy ounce and its decimal subdivisions, whereas the troy pound (of 12 troy ounces) and pennyweight are still legal in the United States, although these are no longer widely used.

In all these systems, the fundamental unit is the pound (lb), and all other units are defined as fractions or multiples of it. The tables of imperial troy mass and apothecaries' mass are the same as the corresponding United States tables, except for the British spelling "drachm" in the table of apothecaries' mass. The table of imperial avoirdupois mass is the same as the United States table up to 1 pound, but above that point the tables differ.

The imperial system has a hundredweight, defined as eight stone of 14 lb each, or 112 lb, whereas a US hundredweight is 100 lb. In both systems, 20 hundredweights make a ton. In the US, the terms long ton and short ton are used to distinguish them. Further, the term metric ton is  used to denote a tonne, which is about 1.6% less than the long ton.

The US customary system also includes the kip, equivalent to 1000 pounds force, which is also occasionally used as a unit of weight of 1000 pounds (most usually in engineering contexts).

See also 

 Conversion of units
 History of measurement
 Systems of measurement
 Weights and measures

Notes

References

Systems of units
Imperial units
Customary units of measurement in the United States
Scientific comparisons